Miguel Afonso de Andrade Leite (São João del-Rei, Minas Gerais state, September 29, 1912 – September 30, 1976), known as Father Miguel of Cajuru, was a Brazilian Catholic priest. 

He was the son of Francisco Afonso de Andrade Leite and Afonsina Batista de Carvalho. He celebrated his first sung Mass on February 22, 1938, in the rural district of São Miguel do Cajuru, near Madre de Deus de Minas.

He was regarded as prodigious in good works.  

He died on September 30, 1976, the day after his 64th birthday, at the Santa Casa da Misericórdia of São João del-Rei. At the wake, the priest's fragile body almost stripped naked in the urn, as the faithful tried to cut off his cassock and take home the little flaps, which turned into miraculous relics. The body was buried inside the Mother Church of São Miguel.

In September 2019, a group of Catholics in the district signed the request for beatification to the diocesan bishop of São João del-Rei, José Eudes Campos do Nascimento. He is thus titled "Servant of God".

Biographical book 
In September 2021, a biographical book was released, with a preface by the priest from Paraiba, and YouTuber, Gabriel Vila Verde, and presentation by the historian Ana Lígia Lira, who wrote a book about the Cimbres Marian apparition (in the Northeast state of Pernambuco), in 1936.

References 

Brazilian Servants of God
1976 deaths
1912 births
20th-century Brazilian Roman Catholic priests
People from São João del-Rei